Hilaard   is a village in Leeuwarden municipality in the province of Friesland, the Netherlands. It had a population of around 297 in January 2017.

History
It was first mentioned in 1329 as Elawerth, and means "settlement of the people of Ele (person / noble man)". Hilaard is a terp (artificial living mound) village from the middle ages. The John the Baptist Church has a 13th century tower. The church itself dates from the 15th or 16th century. The Bolswarder Tolhuis is a former toll house and has a 1652 weapon of the city of Bolsward for whom the toll was collected. In 1840, Hilaard was home to 229 people.

Before 2018, the village was part of the Littenseradiel municipality.

Gallery

References
.

External links

Leeuwarden
Populated places in Friesland